William Struth (16 June 1875 – 21 September 1956) was a Scottish football manager. He was the second manager of Rangers Football Club, leading the club for 34 years between 1920 and 1954, as well as being the holder of a number of other positions, including director.  Struth is one of the most successful managers in Scottish and British football history, winning 30 major trophies in his career; a record 18 Scottish league championships, 10 Scottish Cups and two Scottish League Cups.

Career
Struth was born in Leith, Edinburgh, the eldest child of William Struth senior, a stonemason, and Isabella Cunningham. He grew up in Edinburgh and Milnathort (his father's birthplace) in Kinross-shire and worked as a stonemason, but he also competed as a professional runner until he was in his 30s. In the early 1900s he began helping to train the players at his local football club, Heart of Midlothian, and in 1908 he moved to Glasgow to become the trainer at Clyde. For three seasons at Shawfield he worked alongside Alex Maley, brother of the Celtic manager Willie Maley.

Struth moved to Rangers in 1914 to take up the position of assistant manager. At the age of 45, in 1920, he took over as manager after his predecessor William Wilton was drowned in a boating accident off Gourock.

Struth went on to win the league title 18 times as manager, winning 14 titles in 19 years before the Second World War. This included winning five titles in a row between 1927 and 1931. Struth's tenure as manager spanned the club's first league and cup double in 1928, when Rangers lifted the Scottish Cup and ended a 25-year 'hoodoo', and its first treble in 1949, Struth becoming the first Scottish manager to achieve this honour.

If wartime competitions (the 1939–40 Scottish Emergency League followed by six wartime Southern League championships, the Scottish War Emergency Cup, the 1946 Victory Cup, a Summer Cup and four Southern League Cups) and local tournaments (19 Glasgow Cups, 17 Glasgow Merchants Charity Cups) are included, Struth won a total of 73 trophies during his career, making him the most decorated manager in British football history.

Struth was renowned as a disciplinarian, insisting that the team wore a collar and tie when turning up for training; bowler hats were obligatory for Rangers players. Adam Little was signed by Struth and this interview gives an insight into his methods. 

In 1947, Struth became a Rangers director and was then appointed vice-chairman after retiring in 1954. In 1952 he had part of a leg amputated as a result of gangrene. He died on 21 September 1956, aged 81, at his home in Dumbreck and is buried in Craigton Cemetery, overlooking Ibrox Stadium. His wife, Catherine Forbes, predeceased him in 1941. The grave lies in the south-west section on a terrace on its north side.

Recognition

In 2005, Rangers' chairman Sir David Murray unveiled a bronze bust of Bill Struth, located in the Main Stand at Ibrox, now known as the "Bill Struth Main Stand" in honour of his contribution to Rangers Football Club.

In 2016 a further memorial was placed at his grave listing his club achievements.

Famous quotes 

When being presented with the portrait that now hangs in the Ibrox trophy room, Bill Struth said:

Managerial honours

Club 
Rangers
 Scottish League (18): 1920–21, 1922–23, 1923–24, 1924–25, 1926–27, 1927–28, 1928–29, 1929–30, 1930–31, 1932–33, 1933–34, 1934–35, 1936–37, 1938–39, 1946–47, 1948–49, 1949–50, 1952–53
 Scottish Cup (10): 1927–28, 1929–30, 1931–32, 1933–34, 1934–35, 1935–36, 1947–48, 1949–50, 1952–53
 Scottish League Cup (2): 1946–47, 1948–49

Individual 
 5th most decorated manager of all time (30 trophies)

See also
 List of longest managerial reigns in association football

References

Further reading 
 Mason, David., Stewart, Ian. Mr Struth: The Boss (2013).

Sportspeople from Edinburgh
Rangers F.C. managers
Clyde F.C. non-playing staff
Scottish football managers
1875 births
1956 deaths
Scottish Football Hall of Fame inductees
Heart of Midlothian F.C. non-playing staff
Scottish Football League managers
Association football coaches
People from Leith
Rangers F.C. non-playing staff